The Roman Catholic Diocese of Legnica is a diocese located in the city of Legnica in the Ecclesiastical province of Wrocław in Poland. According to the Catholic Church statistics 30.1% of the population attended a church every Sunday and holy obligation day or more often in 2013.

History
 March 25, 1992: Established as Diocese of Legnica from the Metropolitan Archdiocese of Wrocław
 December 25, 2013: An Eucharistic Miracles knowns as Eucharistic Miracles of Legnica happened. A consacrated host transformed into heart muscle human tissue in agony.This was confirmed by the University of Wrocław and University of Szczecin.

Special churches
Minor Basilicas:
 Bazylika św. Erazma i św. Pankracego w Jeleniej Górze
 Bazylika Wniebowzięcia Najświętszej Marii Panny, Krzeszów
 Bazylika Wniebowzięcia Najświętszej Maryi Panny i św. Mikołaja w Bolesławcu

Leadership
 Bishops of Legnica (Roman rite)
 Bishop Tadeusz Rybak (1992.03.25 – 2005.03.19)
 Bishop Stefan Cichy (2005.03.19 – 2014.04.16)
 Bishop Zbigniew Kiernikowski (2014.04.16 – 2021.06.28)
 Bishop Andrzej Siemieniewski (since 2021.06.28)

See also
Roman Catholicism in Poland

Sources
 GCatholic.org
 Catholic Hierarchy
  Diocese website

 
Christian organizations established in 1992
Roman Catholic dioceses and prelatures established in the 20th century